The 2019 British Motocross Championship is the 68th British Motocross Championship season. Evgeny Bobryshev will start the season as the defending champion in the MX1 class, with Conrad Mewse going into 2019 as the reigning champion in the MX2 class. The championship is due to start on 10 March at FatCat MotoParc, near Armthorpe and will conclude after eight rounds on 15 September at Landrake.

MX1

Calendar and Results
The championship will be contested over 8 rounds.

Participants
List of confirmed riders.

Riders Championship
{|
|

MX2

Calendar and Results
The championship will be contested over 8 rounds.

Participants
List of confirmed riders.

Riders Championship
{|
|

References 

National championships in the United Kingdom
2019 in British motorsport